The Alleghany Mennonite Meetinghouse is located at 39 Horning Road in, Brcknock Township, Pennsylvania. The meetinghouse and its associated cemetery are significant for their role in the Mennonite community in this area of Pennsylvania in the mid to late 19th century. 

The meetinghouse is significant for its Pennsylvania German-style architecture.  

The property was added to the National Register of Historic Places (NRHP) on June 6, 2009, and the listing was announced as the featured listing in the National Park Service's weekly list of June 12, 2009.

Gallery

References

1855 establishments in Pennsylvania
Churches in Berks County, Pennsylvania
Churches on the National Register of Historic Places in Pennsylvania
Mennonitism in Pennsylvania
National Register of Historic Places in Berks County, Pennsylvania